The 1995 Oregon Ducks football team represented the University of Oregon during the 1995 NCAA Division I-A football season. They were led by head coach Mike Bellotti, who was in his 1st season as head coach of the Ducks after replacing Rich Brooks, who resigned in February 1995 to become the head coach of the St. Louis Rams. They played their home games at Autzen Stadium in Eugene, Oregon and participated as members of the Pacific-10 Conference.

Schedule

References

Oregon
Oregon Ducks football seasons
Oregon Ducks football